Åbyskov is a small town located on the island of Funen in south-central Denmark, in Svendborg Municipality. It is five kilometers southeast of Skårup and 10 kilometers east of Svendborg.

References 

Cities and towns in the Region of Southern Denmark
Svendborg Municipality